In baseball, an assist (denoted by A) is a defensive statistic, baseball being one of the few sports in which the defensive team controls the ball. An assist is credited to every defensive player who fields or touches the ball (after it has been hit by the batter) prior to the recording of a putout, even if the contact was unintentional. For example, if a ball strikes a player's leg and bounces off him to another fielder, who tags the baserunner, the first player is credited with an assist. A fielder can receive a maximum of one assist per out recorded. An assist is also credited if a putout would have occurred, had another fielder not committed an error. For example, a shortstop might field a ground ball cleanly, but the first baseman might drop his throw. In this case, an error would be charged to the first baseman, and the shortstop would be credited with an assist. Unlike putouts, exactly one of which is awarded for every defensive out, an out can result in no assists being credited (as in strikeouts, fly outs and line drives), or in assists being credited to multiple players (as in relay throws and rundown plays). In baseball and softball, the second baseman is a fielding position in the infield, commonly stationed between second and first base. The second baseman often possesses quick hands and feet, needs the ability to get rid of the ball quickly, and must be able to make the pivot on a double play. In addition, second basemen are almost always right-handed. Only four left-handed throwing players have appeared as second basemen in the major leagues since 1950; one of the four, Gonzalo Márquez, was listed as the second baseman in the starting lineup for two games in 1973, batting in the first inning, but was replaced before his team took the field on defense, and none of the other three players lasted even a complete inning at the position. In the numbering system used to record defensive plays, the second baseman is assigned the number 4.

Second basemen are most commonly credited with an assist when they field a ground ball and throw the ball either to the first baseman to retire the batter/runner, or to the shortstop covering second base to force out a runner, perhaps beginning a double play. Other common ways in which second basemen gain an assist are by throwing out a runner attempting to reach third base or score, perhaps on a relay throw from the right fielder, rundown plays in which a runner is stranded between bases, throwing out a runner attempting to steal third base on a pickoff throw, and throwing to first or second base after catching a line drive in order to retire a runner before they can tag up. Second basemen and shortstops typically accumulate far more assists than players at other positions due to the frequency of ground balls to the middle infielders; the highest assist total in major league history was recorded by Frankie Frisch in 1927, with all but two of his 643 assists being gained at second base.

As strikeout totals have risen in baseball, the frequency of other defensive outs including ground outs has declined; as a result, assist totals for second basemen have likewise declined, and four of the top five career leaders began their careers prior to 1961. Through 2021, only six of the top 24 single-season totals have been recorded since 1938, only 13 of the top 64 since 1966, and only 14 of the top 192 since 1992. Eddie Collins is the all-time leader with 7,630 career assists; Charlie Gehringer (7,068) is the only other second baseman with over 7,000 career assists.

Key

List

Stats updated as of the end of the 2022 season.

Other Hall of Famers

Notes

References

External links

Major League Baseball statistics
Assists as a catcher